Shooting first entered the Summer Paralympic Games in 1976. Australia has competed at every Paralympic shooting competition.

Medalists

As of the 2012 Games.

Summer Paralympics

1976
Australia won 1 gold medal.

1980

Australia won 2 gold medals, 3 silver medals and 1 bronze medal.

1984

Australia won 9 gold medals.

1988
Australia won 3 gold medals and 1 silver medal.

1992
No Medals

1996
Australia won 1 silver medal.

2000
Australia won 1 silver medal.

2004

Australia won 1 silver medal and 1 bronze medal.

2008
No medals.

2012
Australia won 1 bronze medal.

See also
Australian Paralympic Shooting Team

References 

Paralympic shooters of Australia
Shooting
Paralympic